Ignacio "Ning" R. Ramos (died June 22, 2012) was a Filipino basketball player and coach. 

Ramos played for the Ateneo Blue Eagles in the NCAA from 1949 to 1950. He was part of the Philippine national basketball team that captured the gold medal at the 1951 Asian Games in New Delhi, India. 

Ramos coached the San Miguel Corporation teams in the Manila Industrial and Commercial Athletic Association and the Philippine Basketball Association. Ramos was also the head coach of the national basketball team that participated in the 1972 Summer Olympics.

References

2012 deaths
Ateneo Blue Eagles men's basketball players
Filipino men's basketball coaches
San Miguel Beermen coaches
Asian Games medalists in basketball
Basketball players at the 1951 Asian Games
Basketball players at the 1954 Asian Games
Philippines men's national basketball team players
Filipino men's basketball players
Philippines men's national basketball team coaches
Asian Games gold medalists for the Philippines
Medalists at the 1951 Asian Games
Medalists at the 1954 Asian Games